Aidalai is an album by pop group Mecano. It was released in 1991 and produced by the group. Its launch was in the middle of rumors of the separation of the group due to differences between Nacho Cano and José María Cano. It was their third release with Ariola Records. The title refers to a game word: Aidalai → ¡Ay Dalai!, meaning in English something like Oh Dalai!.

Spain Edition
Aidalai songs range from very minimalist ones like "Sentía" (I felt), a kind of bossa nova music in which the voice of singer Ana Torroja is accompanied by only two acoustic guitars and maracas, to others as complex as "Naturaleza muerta" (Still Nature), which has a complex orchestral string arrangement. However, also on the album are songs typical of the group's techno pop style, like "El fallo positivo" (The positive verdict) about the issue of AIDS, with perhaps one of the best works of vocal arrangements of Nacho Cano, and "Dalai Lama", that narrates the life of the Dalai Lama and the invasion of Tibet by China.

It also includes "El 7 de septiembre" (September 7th), written by Nacho Cano, which won best song of the year in Spain in 1991 and was dedicated to his ex-girlfriend, the writer Coloma Fernández Armero. "Tú" (You), a sensitive song by José María Cano, is also included.

José María Cano's song "Una rosa es una rosa" (A rose is a rose) was inspired by the famous sentences of the writer Gertrude Stein: Rose is a rose is a rose is a rose and the video won in the category of "Best National Video of the Year" in the Ondas Awards and the Lo Nuestro Award for Video of the Year.

Track listing
Tracks:
 "El fallo positivo"  (I. Cano) - 4:00
 "El uno, el dos, el tres"  (J.M. Cano) – 4:41
 "Bailando salsa"  (J.M. Cano)– 4:08
 "El 7 de septiembre"  (I. Cano) – 5:02
 "Naturaleza muerta"  J.M. Cano – 5:02
 "1917 (Instrumental)"  (I.Cano)– 4:12
 "Una rosa es una rosa"  (J.M. Cano) – 4:48
 "El lago artificial" – 3:53 (I.Cano)
 "Tú"  J.M. Cano – 4:10
 "Dalai Lama" – 5:29 ( I.Cano)
 "El peón del rey de negras"  (J.M. Cano) – 4:49
 "J.C."  (I. Cano) – 4:20
 "Sentía" (J.M Cano) – 3:28 
 "El 7 de septiembre (Acoustic version)"  (I. Cano) – 4:36  (Only on the 2005 edition)

Singles
 El 7 de septiembre
 El peón del rey de negras
 Naturaleza muerta
 Dalai Lama
 Una rosa es una rosa
 Tú
 El fallo positivo
 Bailando salsa (Only for Mexico)

Italy Edition
This edition was released simultaneously with the Spain and France editions. It has a length of 56:02 min; it includes 6 tracks in Italian and the rest in Spanish. The adaptations were made by B. Bonezzi and M. Luberti.

Track listing
Tracks:
 "Responso positivo (El fallo positivo)" – 4:00
 "El uno, el dos, el tres" – 4:41
 "Bailando salsa" – 4:08
 "Il 7 di settembre (El 7 de septiembre)" – 5:02
 "Anna e Miguel (Naturaleza muerta)" – 5:02
 "1917 (Instrumental)" – 4:12
 "Una rosa è una rosa (Una rosa es una rosa)" – 4:48
 "El lago artificial" – 3:53
 "Tu (Tú)" – 4:10
 "Dalai Lama (Italian Version)" – 5:29
 "El peón del rey de negras" – 4:49
 "J.C." – 4:20
 "Sentía" – 3:28

Singles
 Tu/Tú (1991)

France Edition
This French edition was released simultaneously with the Spain and Italy editions.  It has a length of 60:22 min. It includes 7 songs in French, 6 in Spanish and an instrumental one. This edition was published by BMG Musique in Quebec, Canada. Its adaptations were made by Luc Plamondon, D. Burgard, M. Penalva and A. Moreau.

Track listing
Tracks:
 "Dis-moi lune d'argent (Hijo de la Luna)" – 4:20
 "El fallo positivo" – 4:00
 "Une histoire à trois (El uno, el dos, el tres)" – 4:41
 "J.C. (French version)" – 4:20
 "Bailando salsa" – 4:08
 "Dalai Lama" – 5:29
 "Toi (Tú)" – 4:10
 "Le 7 septembre (El 7 de septiembre)" – 5:02
 "Una rosa es una rosa" – 4:48
 "Le paradis artificiel (El lago artificial)" – 3:53
 "Nature morte (Naturaleza muerta)" – 5:02
 "1917 (instrumental)" – 4:12
 "El peón del rey de negras" – 4:49
 "Sentía" – 3:28

Singles
 Dis-moi lune d'argent/Hijo de la Luna (1991)
 Nature morte/Naturaleza muerta (1991)
 Toi/Tú (1991)
 Dalai Lama/Le 7 Septembre (1991)

Charts

Album charts

Single charts

Certifications

See also
List of best-selling albums in Spain

References

1991 albums
Mecano albums
Cultural depictions of the 14th Dalai Lama